Events in the year 2021 in San Marino.

Incumbents 
 Captains Regent: 
 Alessandro Cardelli, Mirko Dolcini (until 1 April)
 Giancarlo Venturini, Marco Nicolini (from 1 April to 1 October)
 Francesco Mussoni, Giacomo Simoncini (from 1 October)
 Secretary for Foreign and Political Affairs: Luca Beccari

Events 
Ongoing – COVID-19 pandemic in San Marino

Deaths 
 2 February – Fausta Morganti, politician, former Captain Regent (born 1944).

See also 

 2021 in Europe
 City states

References 

 
2020s in San Marino
Years of the 21st century in San Marino
San Marino
San Marino